South Africa competed at the 1908 Summer Olympics in London, United Kingdom.

Hurdler Doug Stupart carried the flag at the opening ceremony.

Medalists

Results by event

Athletics

South Africa was one of 5 nations to win at least one gold medal in athletics, taking the gold medal in the short sprint.  Reggie Walker was the 100 metres champion, setting a new Olympic record in the semifinals and matching it in the final.  Charles Hefferon added a silver medal in the marathon.

Cycling

Fencing

Tennis

Sources
 
 

Nations at the 1908 Summer Olympics
1908
Olympics